Schneider Township is one of twenty-six townships in Buffalo County, Nebraska, United States. The population was 167 at the 2000 census. A 2006 estimate placed the township's population at 164.

See also
County government in Nebraska

References

External links
City-Data.com

Townships in Buffalo County, Nebraska
Kearney Micropolitan Statistical Area
Townships in Nebraska